Andrea Repossi (born 15 July 1996) is an Italian football player who plays as a winger.

Club career
He made his Serie B debut for Ternana on 17 March 2018 in a game against Ascoli.

References

External links
 

1996 births
Sportspeople from the Metropolitan City of Milan
Footballers from Lombardy
Living people
Italian footballers
Association football forwards
S.S.D. Varese Calcio players
Ternana Calcio players
U.S. Catanzaro 1929 players
Serie B players
Serie C players
Serie D players